Ophthalmoscopy, also called funduscopy, is a test that allows a health professional to see inside the fundus of the eye and other structures using an ophthalmoscope (or funduscope). It is done as part of an eye examination and may be done as part of a routine physical examination. It is crucial in determining the health of the retina, optic disc, and vitreous humor.

The pupil is a hole through which the eye's interior will be viewed. Opening the pupil wider (dilating it) is a simple and effective way to better see the structures behind it. Therefore, dilation of the pupil (mydriasis) is often accomplished with medicated eye drops before funduscopy. However, although dilated fundus examination is ideal, undilated examination is more convenient and is also helpful (albeit not as comprehensive), and it is the most common type in primary care.

An alternative or complement to ophthalmoscopy is to perform a fundus photography, where the image can be analysed later by a professional.

Types

It is of two major types: Direct ophthalmoscopy one that produces an upright, or unreversed, image of approximately 15 times magnification.
 Indirect ophthalmoscopy' one that produces an inverted, or reversed, image of 2 to 5 times magnification.

Each type of ophthalmoscopy has a special type of ophthalmoscope:
 The direct ophthalmoscope is an instrument about the size of a small flashlight (torch) with several lenses that can magnify up to about 15 times. This type of ophthalmoscope is most commonly used during a routine physical examination. The pan-ophthalmoscope has a larger primary lens with a variable focusing, allowing for a wider field-of-view.
 An indirect ophthalmoscope, on the other hand, constitutes a light attached to a headband, in addition to a small handheld lens. It provides a wider view of the inside of the eye. Furthermore, it allows a better view of the fundus of the eye, even if the lens is clouded by cataracts. An indirect ophthalmoscope can be either monocular or binocular. It is used for peripheral viewing of the retina.

Medical uses

Ophthalmoscopy is done as part of a routine physical or complete eye examination, mainly done by optometrists and ophthalmologists. It is used to detect and evaluate symptoms of various retinal vascular diseases or eye diseases such as glaucoma. In patients with headaches, the finding of swollen optic discs, or papilledema, on ophthalmoscopy is a key sign, as this indicates raised intracranial pressure (which could be due to hydrocephalus, benign intracranial hypertension (aka pseudotumor cerebri) or brain tumor, amongst other conditions. Cupped optic discs are seen in glaucoma. In patients with diabetes mellitus, regular ophthalmoscopic eye examinations (once every 6 months to 1 year) are important to screen for diabetic retinopathy as visual loss due to diabetes can be prevented by retinal laser treatment if retinopathy is spotted early. In arterial hypertension, hypertensive changes of the retina closely mimic those in the brain and may predict cerebrovascular accidents (strokes).

Dilation of the pupil

To allow for better inspection through the pupil, which constricts because of light from the ophthalmoscope, it is often desirable to dilate the pupil by application of a mydriatic agent, for instance tropicamide, or simply reducing the brightness of the ophthalmoscope, which may slightly increase natural mydriasis, allowing a better view of the posterior eye.  It is primarily considered ophthalmologist or optometrist equipment, but is used by other specialists as well, including neurology and internal medicine. Recent developments like scanning laser ophthalmoscopy can make good quality images through pupils as small as 2 millimeters, so dilating pupils is no longer needed with these devices.

History

Dr. William Cumming in 1846 at the Royal London Ophthalmic Hospital (later Moorfields Eye Hospital), of his pioneering work wrote "every eye could be made luminous if the axis from a source of illumination directed towards a person's eye and the line of vision of the observer were coincident".

Although some credit the invention of the ophthalmoscope to Charles Babbage in 1847, it was not until it was independently reinvented by Hermann von Helmholtz in 1851 that its usefulness was recognized - it was to  revolutionize ophthalmology.

While training in France, Andreas Anagnostakis, MD, an ophthalmologist from Greece, came up with the idea of making the instrument hand-held by adding a concave mirror. Austin Barnett created a model for Anagnostakis, which he used in his practice and subsequently when presented at the first Ophthalmological Conference in Brussels in 1857, the instrument became very popular among ophthalmologists.

In 1915, Francis A. Welch and William Noah Allyn invented the world's first hand-held direct illuminating ophthalmoscope, precursor to the device now used by clinicians around the world. This refinement and updating of von Helmholtz's invention enabled ophthalmoscopy to become one of the most ubiquitous medical screening techniques in the world today. The company Welch Allyn started as a result of this invention.  In the 1970s a new ophthalmoloscope was developed with a larger primary lens allowing a 5x larger field-of-view, called the "Panoptic" or "pan ophthalmoscope".

Etymology and pronunciation
The word ophthalmoscopy uses combining forms of ophthalmo- + -scopy, yielding "viewing the eye". The word funduscopy derives from fundus + -scopy, yielding "viewing the far inside". The idea that fundus can and should correspond to a combining form fundo- drives the formation of an alternate form, fundoscopy (fundo- + -scopy), which is the subject of a descriptive-versus-prescriptive difference in acceptance. Some dictionaries enter the fundo-'' form as a second-listed variant, but others do not enter it at all, and one prescribes its avoidance with a usage note.

See also
 Charles Schepens
 Retinoscope
 Scanning laser ophthalmoscopy

References

External links
 Ophthalmoscopy on Medlineplus
 Ophthalmoscopy on WebMD
 Overview at bmjjournals.com
 Medlineplus about different types of ophthalmoscopy

Diagnostic ophthalmology
Medical equipment
Ophthalmic equipment